Nagari is a surname. Notable people with the surname include:

Moses Nagari, 14th century Jewish philosopher
Muhammad Yahya Rasool Nagari (died 2020), Pakistani Quran reciter
Shahabuddin Nagari (born 1955), Bangladeshi poet